Top Spin 3 is the third title in the Top Spin series of video games. The game was developed by PAM Development and published by 2K Sports. New game elements include real-time weather effects, more options of professional tennis players, an in-depth character creation tool and new unparalleled gameplay mechanics. It also features impressive advancements in an audio/visual sense with improved Dolby Digital surround sound and "Evolutionary" visuals. Top Spin 4 was released as a sequel about three years later.

Features 
Top Spin 3 incorporates various new features including:

 The incorporation of the right thumbstick, allow for more precise movements and shot variety
 World tennis players' movements and likeness are accurately depicted along with apparel.
 Tennis Legends are now included in the roster of playable licensed players.
 All-new soundtrack: New music is included featuring Jamiroquai, Calvin Harris, Boys Like Girls, The Go! Team, The Stone Roses, and Franz Ferdinand with 'Huddle Formation' being the menu song.
 World Tour: Players are given the opportunity to participate in ranked online tournaments and matches. A new season starts every 1st and 16th day of the month.

Wii version 
The Wii version features motion controls, several venues including three Grand Slams, and multiplayer party games. It features 16 licensed players. This version does not contain online multiplayer gameplay nor does it contain career mode. It runs on a modified Top Spin 2 engine, and features stylized graphics.

Top Spin 3 includes 20 playable professional tennis players including today's superstars, and past professionals. It also contains 7 fictitious male professional players and 13 female professional fictitious players.

Reception 

The PlayStation 3 and Xbox 360 versions received "generally favorable reviews", while the DS and Wii versions received "mixed or average reviews", according to the review aggregation website Metacritic. In Japan, where the game was ported and published by D3 Publisher for the PS3 and Xbox 360 versions on July 30, 2009; for the Wii version on September 3, 2009; and for the DS version on October 15, 2009, Famitsu gave it a score of two sevens, one eight and one seven for the first two console versions, and one seven, one six, one seven and one six for the DS version; while Famitsu Xbox 360 gave the game a score of one six and three sevens for a total of 27 out of 40.

It was a nominee for Best Sports Game for the Nintendo DS by IGN for their 2008 video game awards.

References

External links 
 Official website
 
 
 
 

2008 video games
2K Sports games
Tennis video games
Xbox 360 games
PlayStation 3 games
Wii games
Nintendo DS games
Sports video games set in Italy
Sports video games set in the United States
Video games developed in France
Video games set in Argentina
Video games set in Australia
Video games set in Austria
Video games set in Bermuda
Video games set in Brazil
Video games set in Canada
Video games set in Croatia
Video games set in France
Video games set in Germany
Video games set in Greece
Video games set in England
Video games set in Fiji
Video games set in India
Video games set in Ireland
Video games set in Japan
Video games set in Mexico
Video games set in Morocco
Video games set in the Netherlands
Video games set in Portugal
Video games set in Russia
Video games set in Senegal
Video games set in South Korea
Video games set in Sweden
Video games set in the United Arab Emirates
Take-Two Interactive games